An Attaché Temporaire d'Enseignement et de Recherche (ATER) is a limited-time and limited-renewal contract type in French higher education, requiring among others the engagement to compete for a civil servant position (with no specification of date).

References

Education in France